Rocky Knob may refer to:

 Rocky Knob (Georgia), eight mountain peaks in the North Georgia mountains
 Rocky Knob (Montana), a mountain in Ravalli County, Montana
 Rocky Knob AVA, a Virginia wine region
 A peak in Undullah, Queensland, Australia

See also
 Rocky Mountain (disambiguation)